The 1987–88 international cricket season was from September 1987 to April 1988.

Season overview

October

1987 Cricket World Cup

November

England in Pakistan

West Indies in India

December

New Zealand in Australia

January

1987–88 Benson & Hedges World Series

England in Australia

February

England in New Zealand

Sri Lanka in Australia

March

Pakistan in West Indies

1988 Sharjah Cup

References

1987 in cricket
1988 in cricket